The Florida Gators football program is a college football team that represents the University of Florida in the sport of American football. The Florida Gators compete in the NCAA Division I Football Bowl Subdivision (FBS) of the National Collegiate Athletic Association (NCAA), and the Eastern Division of the Southeastern Conference (SEC). Twenty-nine men have served as the Gators' head coach since the university first fielded a team in 1906, including five who served as interim coach for a portion of a season. Of these, Charlie Bachman, Ray Graves, Doug Dickey, and Steve Spurrier have been inducted into the College Football Hall of Fame. Florida's head coach has been named as the SEC's coach of the year on eight occasions.

Two Gators coaches have led the team to SEC championships: Steve Spurrier won six conference titles while Urban Meyer won two. They also led the Gators to their three national championships; one under Spurrier (in 1996) and two under Meyer (2006 and 2008). Spurrier is Florida's all-time leader in seasons coached (12), conference wins (87), overall wins (122), and winning percentage for coaches serving for two or more seasons (.817).

Coaches

Key

See also 

 Florida Gators
 History of the University of Florida
 List of College Football Hall of Fame inductees (coaches)
 List of Florida Gators in the NFL Draft
 List of Florida Gators football seasons
 University of Florida Athletic Hall of Fame
 University of Florida Athletic Association

Notes

References

Bibliography 

 2009 Southern Conference Football Media Guide,  Year-by-Year Standings, Southern Conference, Spartanburg, South Carolina, pp. 74–77 (2009).
  2011 Florida Gators Football Media Guide, University Athletic Association, Gainesville, Florida, pp. 116–125 (2011).
 Carlson, Norm, University of Florida Football Vault: The History of the Florida Gators, Whitman Publishing, LLC, Atlanta, Georgia (2007).  .
 Golenbock, Peter, Go Gators!  An Oral History of Florida's Pursuit of Gridiron Glory, Legends Publishing, LLC, St. Petersburg, Florida (2002).  .
 Hairston, Jack, Tales from the Gator Swamp: A Collection of the Greatest Gator Stories Ever Told, Sports Publishing, LLC, Champaign, Illinois (2002).  .
 Johnson, Bob,  Interviewee Dennis Keith "Dutch" Stanley, University of Florida Oral History Project, George A. Smathers Libraries, Digital Collections, Gainesville, Florida (July 25, 1974).
 Kabat, Ric A., "Before the Seminoles: Football at Florida State College, 1902–1904, Florida Historical Quarterly, vol. LXX, no. 1 (July 1991).
 McCarthy, Kevin M.,  Fightin' Gators: A History of University of Florida Football, Arcadia Publishing, Mount Pleasant, South Carolina (2000).  .
 McEwen, Tom, The Gators: A Story of Florida Football, The Strode Publishers, Huntsville, Alabama (1974).  .
Nash, Noel, ed., The Gainesville Sun Presents The Greatest Moments in Florida Gators Football, Sports Publishing, Inc., Champaign, Illinois (1998).  .
 Proctor, Samuel, & Wright Langley, Gator History: A Pictorial History of the University of Florida, South Star Publishing Company, Gainesville, Florida (1986).  .
 Saylor, Roger, " Southern Intercollegiate Athletic Association," College Football Historical Society, The LA84 Foundation (1993).

Florida
football coaches